Sir Luke Schaub (1 May 1690 – 27 February 1758) was a British diplomat.

He was chargé d'affaires at Vienna 1715–16 and at Madrid 1719–20. He was envoy to France 1721–24, special envoy to Poland 1730–31, and envoy to Switzerland 1738–43.
 In January 1737 he was involved in the so-called Salmon War between Basle and France.

References

1690 births
1758 deaths
Ambassadors of Great Britain to the Holy Roman Emperor